Strophanthus petersianus, commonly known as sand forest poison rope, is a liana or deciduous shrub up to  long, with a stem diameter up to . Its fragrant flowers feature a white corolla, sometimes with reddish pink stripes on the inside. Strophanthus petersianus has been used as arrow poison and by the Zulu as a charm against evil. Its habitat is coastal forest and rocky woodland. It is native to countries from Kenya south to South Africa.

References

petersianus
Flora of East Tropical Africa
Flora of South Tropical Africa
Flora of the Northern Provinces
Flora of KwaZulu-Natal
Plants described in 1861